aka A Man from Abashiri Prison is a 1965 Japanese film directed by Teruo Ishii and starring Ken Takakura. It is the first entry in the Abashiri Bangaichi / Abashiri Prison series. Highly successful, it was the first hit in the yakuza film genre. It made a star of Takakura and Ishii directed ten more films in the series.

Synopsis
In Hokkaido's Abashiri Prison, Shinichi Tachibana, model prisoner with six months remaining in his sentence is handcuffed to Gonda, a hardened criminal. When Gonda and other inmates escape from the prison, Tachibana must go along.

Cast
 Ken Takakura
 Kōji Nanbara
 Tetsurō Tamba
 Toru Abe
 Kanjūrō Arashi
 Kyosuke Machida
 Kunie Tanaka
 Limm Sueii
 Kenji Ushio
 Koji Takishima
 Koji Miemachi
 Kazu Sugiyoshi
 Seiya Satou
 Joji Yoshimura
 Koji Sekiyama
 Tadashi Suganuma
 Tatsuya Kitayama

References

External links

English

Japanese
 
 
 

1965 films
Films directed by Teruo Ishii
1960s Japanese-language films
Toei Company films
Yakuza films
Films set in Hokkaido
1960s Japanese films